The following lists events that happened during 2014 in Madagascar.

Incumbents
President: Andry Rajoelina (until January 25), Hery Rajaonarimampianina (starting January 25)
Prime Minister: Omer Beriziky (until April 16), Roger Kolo (starting April 16)

Events

January
 January 31 - Hundreds of endangered species from Madagascar are found in a South African airport.

November
 November 21 - The World Health Organization reports that an outbreak of bubonic plague in Madagascar has killed 40 people.

References

 
2010s in Madagascar
Madagascar
Madagascar
Years of the 21st century in Madagascar